Carson Wilford Leach (August 26, 1929 – June 18, 1988) was a Tony Award-winning American theatre director, set designer, film director, screenwriter, and professor.

Biography
Leach was born in Petersburg, Virginia, on August 26, 1929. A performance of Pygmalion he saw as a teenager inspired him to work in theatre. After graduating from the College of William & Mary in 1953, Leach went on to earn both a master's degree and a doctorate from the University of Illinois. Leach began teaching at Sarah Lawrence College in 1958. He also taught at the Yale School of Drama during the years 1978 and 1979.

After moving to New York City, Leach became the artistic director of La MaMa Experimental Theatre Club for much of the 1970s. At La MaMa, he frequently collaborated with John Braswell. They directed the ETC Company, a resident company of La MaMa, in a repertory that included adaptations of Carmilla, Demon, The Only Jealousy of Emer, Renard, and Gertrude, a musical about the title character based loosely on Gertrude Stein.

Leach also directed works for Joseph Papp's Public Theater and the New York Shakespeare Festival, where he directed a production of The Pirates of Penzance in 1980 with Kevin Kline, Linda Ronstadt, Rex Smith, and Patricia Routledge. The production transferred to Broadway with the same cast in January 1981, with Estelle Parsons replacing Routledge. Leach won a Tony Award for Best Direction of a Musical for the Broadway production in 1981. Leach directed a film version of The Pirates of Penzance in 1983 with the same cast, with Angela Lansbury replacing Parsons.

Leach's additional theatre directing credits include two projects that originated at the Public and then transferred to Broadway: The Human Comedy (1984) and The Mystery of Edwin Drood (1986), for which he won his second Tony Award.

While teaching at Sarah Lawrence, Leach met then-students Brian De Palma and Cynthia Munroe. In collaboration with De Palma and Munroe, he produced, directed, and wrote the screenplay for the 1969 film The Wedding Party, whose cast included a young Robert De Niro and Jill Clayburgh. He also directed the films All's Well That Ends Well (1978) with Frances Conroy for television and a straight-to-video version of Coriolanus (1979) with Denzel Washington and Morgan Freeman.

The protagonist of Brian De Palma's film Phantom of the Paradise (1974), Winslow Leach, is named after Wilford Leach.

Leach died at the age of 58 from AIDS-related stomach cancer in Rocky Point, New York.

References

External links
 
 
Wilford Leach at the Lortel off-Broadway Database
Wilford Leach's page on La MaMa Archives Digital Collections

American theatre directors
American scenic designers
American television directors
College of William & Mary alumni
Deaths from cancer in New York (state)
Deaths from stomach cancer
Drama Desk Award winners
People from Petersburg, Virginia
Tony Award winners
Sarah Lawrence College faculty
1929 births
1988 deaths
Film directors from Virginia
People with HIV/AIDS